Berismyia fusca is a species in the soldier fly family and the genus Berismyia. The species was described in 1892 by Italian entomologist Ermanno Giglio-Tos.

Distribution
Mexico, Costa Rica.

References

Stratiomyidae
Insects described in 1891
Diptera of North America
Taxa named by Ermanno Giglio-Tos